This is a list of Laos representatives at major international beauty pageants: Miss Universe, Miss World, Miss International, Miss Supranational, Miss Grand International and Miss Intercontinental

Titleholders

Miss Universe Laos

Winners by province

Miss World Laos

Winners by province

Miss International Laos

Winners by province

Miss Supranational Laos

Winners by province

Miss Grand Laos

Winners by province

Miss Laos representatives at International beauty pageants

Miss Universe Laos
The winner of Miss Universe Laos represents her country at the Miss Universe. On occasion, when the winner does not qualify (due to age) a runner-up is sent.''

Miss World Laos
The winner of Miss World Laos (separate pageant) represents her country at the Miss World. On occasion, when the winner does not qualify (due to age) a runner-up is sent. Before 2018 the 2nd placed of Miss Universe Laos went to Miss World.

Miss International Laos
The Miss International Laos award from Miss Universe Laos contest or other pageants represents her country at the Miss International. On occasion, when the receiver does not qualify (due to age) another awardee is sent.

Miss Earth Laos

Miss Supranational Laos
The Miss Supranational Laos award from Miss Universe Laos contest or other pageants represents her country at the Miss Supranational. On occasion, when the receiver does not qualify (due to age) another awardee is sent.

Miss Grand Laos
The winner of Miss Grand Laos represents her country at the Miss Grand International. On occasion, when the winner does not qualify (due to age) a runner-up is sent.

Miss Global Laos

Miss Intercontinental Laos

Miss Tourism Queen International Laos

Miss Tourism International Laos

Miss Tourism Queen of the Year International Laos

Miss Tourism Metropolitan International Laos

See also 
Miss Laos
 List of beauty pageants

References

General references

 

Beauty pageants in Laos
Laos
Laos
Laos
Laos
Laos 
Beauty pageants in Asia
Entertainment events in Laos
Women in Laos
Laotian awards